Liberty is a city in and the county seat of Clay County, Missouri, United States and is a suburb of Kansas City, located in the Kansas City Metropolitan Area. As of the 2020 United States Census the population was 30,167. Liberty is home to William Jewell College.

History 

Liberty was settled in 1822, and shortly later became the county seat of Clay County. The city was named for the American concept of liberty.

In 1830, David Rice Atchison established a law office in Liberty. He was joined three years later by colleague Alexander William Doniphan. The two argued cases defending the rights of Mormon settlers in Jackson County,  served Northwest Missouri in Missouri's General Assembly, and labored for the addition of the Platte Purchase to Missouri's boundaries.

In October 1838, the two were ordered by Governor Lilburn Boggs to arrest Mormon prophet Joseph Smith Jr. at the Far West settlement in Caldwell County. Immediately after the conclusion of the Mormon War, Smith and other Mormon leaders were incarcerated at the Liberty Jail for the winter as Doniphan labored for a quicker trial date. Although Doniphan led a force of Missouri volunteers ordered to capture the leaders, he defended Joseph Smith in trial and won him a change in venue.  While en route to their new venue, Smith and his followers escaped and left Missouri for the new Mormon settlement in Nauvoo, Illinois.

The Arthur-Leonard Historic District, Clay County Savings Association Building, Clinton House, Dougherty-Prospect Heights Historic District, Garrison School Historic District, Frank Hughes Memorial Library, IOOF Liberty Lodge No. 49, Jewell Hall, Jewell-Lightburne Historic District, Major Hotel, Miller Building, Mt. Memorial Cemetery, Nebo Hill Archeological Site, Odd Fellows Home District, South Liberty Courthouse Square Historic District, and West Liberty Courthouse Square Historic District are listed on the National Register of Historic Places.

Geography
Liberty is located approximately six miles north of the Missouri River along I-35 and Missouri Route 291.

Demographics

2010 census
As of the census of 2010, there were 29,149 people, 10,582 households, and 7,555 families living in the city. The racial makeup of the city was 91.4% White, 3.6% African American, 0.5% Native American, 1.0% Asian, 0.1% Pacific Islander, 0.9% from other races, and 2.6% from two or more races. Hispanic or Latino of any race were 4.1% of the population.

There were 10,582 households, of which 38.2% had children under the age of 18 living with them, 56.4% were married couples living together, 11.0% had a female householder with no husband present, 4.0% had a male householder with no wife present, and 28.6% were non-families. 23.4% of all households were made up of individuals, and 8% had someone living alone who was 65 years of age or older. The average household size was 2.63 and the average family size was 3.11.

The median age in the city was 36.4 years. 26.6% of residents were under the age of 18; 9.8% were between the ages of 18 and 24; 26% were from 25 to 44; 26.5% were from 45 to 64; and 11.1% were 65 years of age or older. The gender makeup of the city was 48.7% male and 51.3% female.

2000 census
As of the census of 2000, there were 26,232 people, 9,511 households, and 6,943 families living in the city. The racial makeup of the city was 93.75% White, 2.59% African American, 0.40% Native American, 0.61% Asian, 0.06% Pacific Islander, 0.99% from other races, and 1.59% from two or more races. Hispanic or Latino of any race were 2.68% of the population.

There were 9,511 households, out of which 38.9% had children under the age of 18 living with them, 59.2% were married couples living together, 10.9% had a female householder with no husband present, and 27.0% were non-families. 22.4% of all households were made up of individuals, and 7.9% had someone living alone who was 65 years of age or older. The average household size was 2.62 and the average family size was 3.08.

In the city the population was spread out, with 27.6% under the age of 18, 10.4% from 18 to 24, 30.2% from 25 to 44, 21.5% from 45 to 64, and 10.4% who were 65 years of age or older. The median age was 34 years. For every 100 females, there were 91.9 males. For every 100 females age 18 and over, there were 89.6 males.

The median income for a household in the city was $52,745, and the median income for a family was $61,273. Males had a median income of $41,713 versus $28,516 for females. The per capita income for the city was $23,415. About 3.8% of families and 5.0% of the population were below the poverty line, including 5.1% of those under age 18 and 6.1% of those age 65 or over.

Economy
Major employers in Liberty include the Hallmark distribution warehouse. Liberty is also home to the operations headquarters for Ferrellgas, the 2nd largest retail provider of propane in the United States.  The B&B Theatres corporate office is located in Liberty, the 5th largest theater chain in the U.S. While technically not in Liberty, the Ford Kansas City Assembly Plant is a major employer in nearby Claycomo.

Top employers
According to the town's 2016 Comprehensive Annual Financial Report, the top employers in the city are:

Education
The Liberty 53 School District operates ten elementary, four middle and two senior high schools.

Liberty has a public library, a branch of the Mid-Continent Public Library.

Liberty is also home to William Jewell College, a private, four-year liberal arts college of more than 900 undergraduate students that was founded in 1849.

Notable people

 David Allen, former American football running back for the Jacksonville Jaguars and St. Louis Rams.
 Ken Boyer, former third baseman and manager of the St. Louis Cardinals.
 James Dewees, keyboardist and back-up vocalist of The Get Up Kids, and started Reggie and the Full Effect.
 Alexander William Doniphan, Mexican War general who prevented the execution of the Mormon prophet Joseph Smith.
 Hubert Eaton, visionary and developer of the world-famous Forest Lawn cemeteries in California.
 Shea Groom, soccer player
 Gatewood Lincoln, governor of American Samoa.
 George Rice, football player
 Alex Saxon, actor (The Fosters, Finding Carter)
 Craig Stevens, star of the 1950s television series Peter Gunn.
 Matt Wertz, soft rock singer/songwriter.
 Greg Canuteson, former mayor and state representative
 Scott Carroll, Former Professional Baseball Player.
 Nick Robinson, Former Stanford Basketball player and College Basketball coach.
 Eric Staves, Actor Goat (2016 film), Empire (2015 TV series) and American Horror Story: 1984

Cultural references

The Liberty Jail is now an open museum and tourist site. The Clay County Historical Society Museum features period room displays, a historic pharmacy counter, toys and dolls, model trains, tools and more.

Twin towns
  Diekirch, Luxembourg

References

External links

 City of Liberty
 Liberty Area Economic Development
 Historic maps of Liberty in the Sanborn Maps of Missouri Collection at the University of Missouri

 
Cities in Missouri
Cities in Clay County, Missouri
Cities in Kansas City metropolitan area
Significant places in Mormonism
County seats in Missouri
Populated places established in 1822
1822 establishments in Missouri